Christian Fong is an entrepreneur and former political candidate. A former resident of Cedar Rapids, Iowa, he currently lives in Mill Valley, California with his wife Jenelle and three children. He announced in June 2009 that he was seeking the Republican nomination for the 2010 Iowa Gubernatorial Election. In December 2009, Fong suspended his campaign due to difficulty raising campaign funds  after the entry of former Governor Terry E. Branstad to the race.  At the age of 35, Fong was widely seen as a rising star within the Iowa Republican Party and was named as a possible Lieutenant Governor candidate for former Governor Terry E. Branstad's successful 2010 gubernatorial bid.

Life and education 
Fong is the son of a Chinese immigrant who fled Communist China as his family was persecuted and killed for their Christian faith. Fong was born in the state of Maine in the United States in 1977 and was brought up in humble circumstances. Christian graduated from Underwood (Iowa) High School at age 16 with valedictorian honors, received a B.S. in Statistics, summa cum laude, from Creighton University in 1996 and then studied at Dartmouth College, receiving his MBA in Statistics from the Tuck School of Business, with high distinction.

Political positions 
Christian Fong was known for pro-growth political policies.  He was appointed by then Iowa Governor Chet Culver to the Generation Iowa Commission in 2007, and was elected by his peers as Chair where he traveled around the state meeting and advising local and state government entities, as well as business groups, on attracting and retaining next generation workforce.  Fong proposed tax reform to increase sustainable growth and to lower the tax burden on the middle class, stating that during a deep recession is "the worst possible time to raise taxes".  He was a strong supporter of a balanced budget, fiscal responsibility, community driven business growth policies and expanding sustainable sources of power.

After the Iowa Supreme Court ruled unconstitutional the state's statute banning same-sex marriage, Fong urged the GOP to move past being a single-issue party focused on banning same-sex marriage.  Fong encouraged a middle ground of civil unions and democratically-driven change, stating "The Legislature says one thing and the Supreme Court says the opposite. The law is clear. There is one arbiter when you have a disagreement and it's not the governor, it's the people of Iowa". He is also pro-life.

Career
After his campaign for Governor of Iowa, Christian founded Renewable Energy Trust Capital (RET), a clean energy renewable energy power producer headquartered in San Francisco, CA, credited with inventing the financial technology that become the multi-billion dollar industry of renewable energy "yieldcos".  Christian served as the original CEO, raising over $250 million in venture capital, then as COO/CFO and Chief Investment Officer after former California PUC commissioner John Bohn  was recruited as CEO.  BlueMountain Capital acquired RET for an undisclosed amount in a private transaction.  He went on to serve as an Independent Director on the Boards of Directors of prominent yieldco Terraform Power (NASDAQ: TERP), of privately owned Spruce Finance, a solar and energy efficiency finance firm and as Founder and President of Fong Management LLC.  In 2018, Fong became the CEO of Spruce Power, based in Houston, TX, and is the largest privately held residential solar company in the United States. They currently serve more than 80,000 clean energy customers in 16 states. Under Fong’s leadership, Spruce Power has grown substantially through the acquisition of distressed and often orphaned portfolios containing neglected customers. Spruce Power has received more than 70 complaints from customers on the Better Business Bureau website and has an average customer rating of one in five stars. The complaints reflect less than 0.1% of Spruce Power's total customer base, ranking Spruce Power with a lower complaint rate than the residential solar industry average.

Prior to his 2009 campaign for Governor of Iowa, Christian was Managing Director of Capital Markets at AEGON USA Reality Advisors and served as president and CEO of Corridor Recovery, helping with flood recovery efforts in Eastern Iowa. Additionally, Christian chaired the Small Business Task Force of the Cedar Rapids Chamber of Commerce.

References

1977 births
American politicians of Chinese descent
Creighton University alumni
Iowa Republicans
Tuck School of Business alumni
Living people